Sphingobacterium kyonggiense is a Gram-negative, strictly aerobic, rod-shaped and non-motile bacterium from the genus Sphingobacterium which has been isolated from soil contaminated with trichloroethene in Suwon in Korea.

References

External links
Type strain of Sphingobacterium kyonggiense at BacDive -  the Bacterial Diversity Metadatabase

Sphingobacteriia
Bacteria described in 2012